Take Me Home is a 2011 American romantic comedy film directed by and starring Sam Jaeger. The film also stars his wife Amber Jaeger, Lin Shaye, and Victor Garber. It premiered on April 19, 2011, at the Nashville Film Festival. Take Me Home was released to DVD on May 29, 2012.

Plot
After getting turned down for a job, Thom finds his landlord putting all of his belongings into the hallway. With no job prospects and no place to sleep, he turns to driving his illegal taxicab around the streets of New York. Claire Barrow isn't having a good day either and needs a taxi. Her husband is flirting with his secretary and her estranged father has suffered a heart attack in California. In a frenzy, she hails what she assumes to be a legit cab, which is driven by Thom. With her life in ruins, Claire decides to pay Thom to drive her out to California and he reluctantly agrees. The path across America takes more than the usual detours and that forces them to choose between the lives they've left behind, and the possibilities glimpsed along their journey.

Cast

 Sam Jaeger as Thom Colvin
 Amber Jaeger as Claire Barrow
 Victor Garber as Arnold - Thom's father
 Cristine Rose as Lynette - Thom's mother
 Lin Shaye as Jill - Claire's mother
 Bree Turner as Eve - Claire's sister
 Brennan Elliott as Eric - Claire's husband

Development
Jaeger began writing the script for Take Me Home in 2004, with the first draft taking him three months to complete and the second draft two years. Filming took place in thirteen states, with Ohio initially set as the backdrop for the story.

Reception
Connect Savannah and the Napa Valley Register both praised the film, with the Napa Valley Register calling it "truly engrossing and definitely funny".

Awards

References

External links
 
 
 

2011 films
2011 romantic comedy films
American romantic comedy films
American independent films
2010s comedy road movies
American comedy road movies
Films set in New York City
Films set in the Las Vegas Valley
Films set in California
Films shot in New York City
Films shot in the Las Vegas Valley
Films shot in California
2011 directorial debut films
2011 independent films
2010s English-language films
2010s American films